Harispattuwa Divisional Secretariat is a  Divisional Secretariat of Kandy District, of Central Province, Sri Lanka. Its office is located in Nugawela near the Kandy North bus depot.

References
 Divisional Secretariats Portal

Divisional Secretariats of Kandy District
Geography of Kandy District